Silvanus unidentatus, is a species of silvanid flat bark beetle in the family Silvanidae. Native to Eurasia, it is established in North America and Chile.

References

Silvanidae
Beetles described in 1790